Literal translation, direct translation or word-for-word translation, is a translation of a text done by translating each word separately, without looking at how the words are used together in a phrase or sentence.

In translation theory, another term for "literal translation" is metaphrase (as opposed to paraphrase for an analogous translation).

Literal translation leads to mistranslation of idioms, which was once a serious problem for machine translation.

The term as used in translation studies

Usage
The term "literal translation" often appeared in the titles of 19th-century English translations of classical, Bible and other texts.

Cribs
Word-for-word translations ("cribs," "ponies" or "trots") are sometimes prepared for a writer who is translating a work written in a language they do not know. For example, Robert Pinsky is reported to have used a literal translation in preparing his translation of Dante's Inferno (1994), as he does not know Italian. Similarly, Richard Pevear worked from literal translations provided by his wife, Larissa Volokhonsky, in their translations of several Russian novels.

Poetry to prose
Literal translation can also denote a translation that represents the precise meaning of the original text but does not attempt to convey its style, beauty, or poetry. There is, however, a great deal of difference between a literal translation of a poetic work and a prose translation. A literal translation of poetry may be in prose rather than verse, but also be error free. Charles Singleton's translation of the Divine Comedy (1975) is regarded as a prose translation.

As bad practice 

"Literal" translation implies that it is probably full of errors, since the translator has made no effort to (or is unable to) convey correct idioms or shades of meaning, for example, but it can also be a useful way of seeing how words are used to convey meaning in the source language.

Examples
A literal English translation of the German phrase "Ich habe Hunger" would be "I have hunger" in English, but this is clearly not a phrase that would generally be used in English, even though its meaning might be clear. Literal translations in which individual components within words or compounds are translated to create new lexical items in the target language (a process also known as “loan translation”) are called calques, e.g., “beer garden” from German “.”

The literal translation of the Italian sentence, "" ("I know that this is not good"), produces "Know(I) that this not goes(it) well," which has English words and Italian grammar.

Machine translation
Early machine translations (as of 1962 at least) were notorious for this type of translation, as they simply employed a database of words and their translations. Later attempts utilized common phrases which resulted in better grammatical structure and capture of idioms, but with many words left in the original language. For translating synthetic languages, a morphosyntactic analyzer and synthesizer is required.

The best systems today use a combination of the above technologies and apply algorithms to correct the "natural" sound of the translation. In the end, though, professional translation firms that employ machine translation use it as a tool to create a rough translation that is then tweaked by a human, professional translator.

Douglas Hofstadter gave an example for the failures of a machine translation: The English sentence "In their house, everything comes in pairs. There's his car and her car, his towels and her towels, and his library and hers." is translated into French as "" That does not make sense, because the literal translation of both "his" and "hers" into French is "" in case of singular, and "" in case of plural, therefore the French version is not understandable.

Pidgins
Often, first-generation immigrants create something of a literal translation in how they speak their parents' native language. This results in a mix of the two languages in something of a pidgin. Many such mixes have specific names, e.g. Spanglish or Denglisch. For example, American children of German immigrants are heard using "rockingstool" from the German word "" instead of "rocking chair".

Translator's humor
Literal translation of idioms is a source of translators' jokes and apocrypha. The following has often been told in relation to inexperienced translators or to machine translations: When the sentence, "The spirit is willing, but the flesh is weak" ("", an allusion to Mark 14:38) was translated into Russian and then back into English, the result was "The vodka is good, but the meat is rotten" (""). This is generally believed to be an amusing apocrypha rather than a reference to an actual machine-translation error.

See also 
All your base are belong to us
Calque
Dynamic and formal equivalence
Literal Standard Version
Metaphrase
Semantic translation
Translation
Transliteration
Young's Literal Translation (of the Bible)

References

Further reading
Olive Classe, Encyclopedia of literary translation into English, vol. 1, Taylor & Francis, 2000, p. viii.

Translation studies
Error